This page shows the results of the 1999 Men's Central American and Caribbean Basketball Championship, also known as the 1999 Centrobasket, which was held in the city of Havana, Cuba from May 4 to May 9, 1999. The top four teams qualified for the 1999 Pan American Tournament, scheduled for July 14 to July 25 at the Roberto Clemente Coliseum in San Juan, Puerto Rico.

Competing nations

Preliminary round

1999-05-04

1999-05-05

1999-05-06

 

1999-05-04

1999-05-05

1999-05-06

Consolidation Round
1999-05-08 — 5th/8th place

1999-05-08 — 1st/4th place

Final round
1999-05-09 — 7th/8th place

1999-05-09 — 5th/6th place

1999-05-09 — 3rd/4th place

1999-05-09 — 1st/2nd place

Final ranking

1. 

2. 

3. 

4. 

5. 

6. 

7. 

8.

References
LatinBasket
Results

Centrobasket
1998–99 in North American basketball
1999 in Central American sport
1999 in Caribbean sport
1999 in Cuban sport
International basketball competitions hosted by Cuba